Myopa buccata is a species of fly from the genus Myopa in the family Conopidae. Their larvae are endoparasites of bumble bees of the genus Bombus. It is common throughout much of Europe.

References 

Parasitic flies
Parasites of bees
Conopidae
Flies described in 1758
Muscomorph flies of Europe
Taxa named by Carl Linnaeus
Endoparasites